A two dimensional Minkowski space, i.e. a flat space with one time and one spatial dimension, has a two-dimensional Poincaré group IO(1,1) as its symmetry group. The respective Lie algebra is called the Poincaré algebra. It is possible to extend this algebra to a supersymmetry algebra, which is a -graded Lie superalgebra. The most common ways to do this are discussed below.

algebra 
Let the Lie algebra of IO(1,1) be generated by the following generators:
  is the generator of the time translation,
  is the generator of the space translation,
  is the generator of Lorentz boosts. 
For the commutators between these generators, see Poincaré algebra.

The  supersymmetry algebra over this space is a supersymmetric extension of this Lie algebra with the four additional generators (supercharges) , which are odd elements of the Lie superalgebra. Under Lorentz transformations the generators  and  transform as left-handed Weyl spinors, while  and  transform as right-handed Weyl spinors. The algebra is given by the Poincaré algebra plus

The supercharges are related via .

Subalgebras of the  algebra

The  and  subalgebras 
Thus its anti-commutation relations are given by

Both generators are left-handed Weyl spinors.

Both supercharge generators are right-handed.

The  subalgebra 
The  subalgebra is generated by two generators  and  given by

By definition, both supercharges are real, i.e. . They transform as Majorana-Weyl spinors under Lorentz transformations. Their anti-commutation relations are given by

where  is a real central charge.

The  and  subalgebras 
These algebras can be obtained from the  subalgebra by removing  resp. from the generators.

See also 
 Supersymmetry
 Super-Poincaré algebra (in 1+3 dimensions)

References 

 K. Schoutens, Supersymmetry and factorized scattering, Nucl.Phys. B344, 665–695, 1990
 T.J. Hollowood, E. Mavrikis, The N = 1 supersymmetric bootstrap and Lie algebras, Nucl. Phys. B484, 631–652, 1997, arXiv:hep-th/9606116

Supersymmetry
Mathematical physics
Lie algebras